Brennand may refer to:

People 
Alfred Eric Brennand (born 2005), X-Wing Professional/Producer
Francisco Brennand (1927–2019), Brazilian sculptor
Oliver Brennand (born 1986), British rugby union footballer
Ricardo Brennand (born 1927), Brazilian entrepreneur

Places 
Brennand Airport, airport in Winnebago County, Wisconsin, United States
Brennand Farm, often claimed to be the true centre of Great Britain
 Brennand River, river in England